The Trumpet Child is the tenth studio album by Over the Rhine, released in  2007.  In addition to the CD, the album was also released on 180-gram vinyl.

Track listing
I Don’t Wanna Waste Your Time (Detweiler) (4:01)
Trouble (Bergquist) (4:00)
I’m on a Roll (Bergquist, Detweiler) (3:18)
Nothing Is Innocent (Bergquist/Detweiler) (3:52)
The Trumpet Child (Detweiler) (3:45)
Entertaining Thoughts (Bergquist) (3:08)
Who’m I Kiddin’ But Me (Bergquist) (3:28)
Let’s Spend the Day in Bed (Bergquist/Detweiler) (5:47)
Desperate for Love (Detweiler) (3:05)
Don’t Wait for Tom (Detweiler) (4:19)
If a Song Could Be President (Detweiler) (3:09)

Personnel
Linford Detweiler: Piano, Acoustic Guitar, wurlitzer electric piano, rhodes, hammond organ, tack piano, voice
Karin Bergquist: Voice, acoustic guitar
Mickey Grimm: Drum kit, percussion, 10W30
Devon Ashley: Drum kit, percussion
Lindsay Jamieson: Drum kit, percussion
Brad Jones: Upright bass, bass, electric guitar, percussion, bass harmonica, chamberlin, Swampy slide
David Henry: Cello
Neil Rosengarden: Trumpet, muted trumpets, valve trombone
Jim Hoke: Saxophone, alto flute, vibes, clarinets, bass clarinet
Tony Paoletta: Goldklang slide
Chris Carmichael: Violin, cello, viola
Rick Plant: Slide guitar
Matt Slocum: Electric guitar
Tony Paoletta: Pedal steel

Notes
The front cover illustration and package design was done by Perrysburg, Ohio-based Madhouse, marking the first non-Christmas, non-compilation album not to feature a Michael Wilson photograph on the cover.  However, Wilson's work does appear in the CD booklet.
The lyrics to "Don't Wait For Tom" contain several references to Tom Waits songs, including "Swordfish Trombones," "Ol' 55," and "Make It Rain."

References

External links
 The Trumpet Child - entry on OTR's official site

Over the Rhine (band) albums
2007 albums